Cambligneul is a commune in the Pas-de-Calais department in the Hauts-de-France region of France.

Geography
A farming village located 10 miles (16 km) northwest of Arras at the junction of the D75 with the D73E.

Population

Places of interest
 The church of St.Kilian, dating from the nineteenth century.
 A large elm tree.

See also
Communes of the Pas-de-Calais department

References

Communes of Pas-de-Calais